The Isabela oriole (Oriolus isabellae) is a species of the oriole family endemic to Luzon in the Philippines. The bird was presumed to be extinct for many years until its rediscovery in December 1993 near Diffun, Quirino, and in Mansarong in September 1994. Additional sightings were made in San Mariano, Isabela. and Baggao, Cagayan Valley It It is found in moist lowland forest up to 440 masl. It is threatened by habitat loss and hunting.

Taxonomy and systematics
The Isabela oriole is commonly confused with the much more common white-lored orioles and black-naped orioles. It is differentiated by its extremely large bill grey bill, uniform olive-yellow plumage and lack of white on its lores.

The Isabela oriole is most closely related to the white-lored oriole. Both species are closely related to the paraphyletic Philippine oriole. The Isabela oriole is sometimes considered to form a superspecies with the dark-throated oriole and the Philippine oriole. Alternate names for the Isabela oriole include the green-lored oriole and olive-lored oriole.

Distribution and habitat
The Isabela oriole is now confined to the lowland forests in the Northern Sierra Madre mountain range in Luzon. It is frequently seen in the canopy and middle storeys of forests and also forest edge or patches up to 440 masl. It is seen in mixed flocks with other birds such as bar-bellied cuckooshrikes, black-and-white trillers, blackish cuckooshrikes and other forest birds.

It has not been recorded in Bataan province since 1947 despite an intensive search done in 2014.

Conservation Status
The Isabela oriole has a known population of about 50-250 mature individuals and is assessed as Critically Endangered based on its extremely small and fragmented population. Organisations such as Buhay-Ilang and the Mabuwaya Foundation  are working to conserve them with educational programs and festivals celebrating this bird. The oriole is now a Flagship species for the North Sierra Madre National Park.

Since 2015, a research and conservation project for the Isabela Oriole has been implemented in Baggao by the Mabuwaya Foundation. Information, education and communication, community consultations are held in Baggao with the local government, the Department of Environment and Natural Resources and local residents. Plans are underway to declare the oriole site in Baggao a Critical Habitat and to encourage ecotourism.

References

Isabela oriole
Birds of Luzon
Endemic fauna of the Philippines
Critically endangered fauna of Asia
Isabela oriole
Isabela oriole